The Little Bridge is an undated landscape painting by the Dutch painter Gillis Rombouts. It is now in the Musée des Beaux-Arts of Strasbourg, France. Its inventory number is 423.

Writing in 1894, the specialist Cornelis Hofstede de Groot described this painting as one of Rombout's masterpieces. In the year of Schubart's death, 1899, the collection was sold at an auction in Munich, where Georg Dehio bought the painting on behalf of the Strasbourg museum, for 2,900 Mark.

The Little Bridge is signed but not dated. It depicts a little wooden bridge over a canal, in which some ducks are swimming. The largest house on the right has been identified as an inn.

References

External links 

Paintings in the collection of the Musée des Beaux-Arts de Strasbourg
Dutch Golden Age paintings
Landscape paintings
Oil paintings